400m sprint events began in the 1976 Summer Paralympics was open to both male and female wheelchair competitors. In the 1980 Summer Paralympics, able bodied competitors also took part in this event.

Men's medal summaries

Ambulant athletes

Amputee athletes

Blind athletes

Wheelchair athletes

Women's medal summaries

Ambulant athletes

Amputee athletes

Blind athletes

Wheelchair athletes

See also
Athletics at the Olympics
400 metres at the Olympics

References

Athletics at the Summer Paralympics
400 metres